Craig Boynton (born June 19, 1964) is a tennis coach and former player from the United States.

Boynton made his only singles appearance in the Grand Prix circuit at the 1988 U.S. Pro Tennis Championships; he entered the main draw as a qualifier, and lost to countryman Richey Reneberg in the first round.

After retiring from playing, he became a coach in 1993. He has been the coach of Hubert Hurkacz since March 2019, and has worked with players like Jim Courier, John Isner and Mardy Fish in the past.

Personal life
Boynton is married to former professional tennis player Teri Whitlinger. Their three children were born in Cincinnati before the family moved to Tampa in 2004.

References

External links
 
 

1964 births
Living people
American male tennis players
Tennis people from Ohio
Arkansas Razorbacks men's tennis players
American tennis coaches
Tennis players from Tampa, Florida
People from Massillon, Ohio